Elovo is a village in the municipality of Studeničani, North Macedonia.

History 
During the great migration movements in Macedonia at the end of the 17th and beginning of the 18th centuries, Macedonian Muslims left the Debar area for the central regions of Macedonia and established villages such as Elovo located in the Skopje area.

Demographics
On the 1927 ethnic map of Leonhard Schulze-Jena, the village is written as "Elova" and shown as a Muslim Albanian village. Elovo has traditionally been inhabited by a Macedonian Muslim (Torbeš) population. The language of daily communication is Macedonian. In Elovo there are small numbers of Albanians from the neighbouring village of Crn Vrv who reside there through marriage with locals and are assimilated in the village.

According to the 2021 census, the village had a total of 198 inhabitants. Ethnic groups in the village include:

Turks 98
Albanians 1
Others 99

See also 
 Macedonian Muslims (Torbeši)

References

Villages in Studeničani Municipality
Macedonian Muslim villages
Turkish communities in North Macedonia